A list of films produced in the Soviet Union in 1967 (see 1967 in film).

1967

External links
 Soviet films of 1967 at the Internet Movie Database

1967
Soviet
Films